Stana may refer to:

 Stana River, a tributary of the Râul Cetăţii in Romania
 Stana (musician), real name Aram Alnashéa, Swedish musician, producer, songwriter
 Stana Katic, Canadian actress
 Stana Izbașa, Romanian folk music singer from Romania
 Stana Tomasević-Arnesen, politician in the government of Yugoslavia
 Daniel Stana (born 1982), Romanian professional football player
 Rastislav Staňa, Slovak ice hockey player

See also 
 Stâna (disambiguation)
 Stan (surname)